Ramsbottom Urban District was, from 1894 to 1974, a local government district of the administrative county of Lancashire, England. Its area was coterminate with Ramsbottom, spanning an area of the Rossendale Valley north of the County Borough of Bury.

The Urban District was created by the Local Government Act 1894, and abolished by the Local Government Act 1972; in 1974 the Central, East, South and West wards of the district joined the Metropolitan Borough of Bury, the North and Walmersley cum Shuttleworth wards to the Borough of Rossendale.

References

Districts of England created by the Local Government Act 1894
Districts of England abolished by the Local Government Act 1972
History of Lancashire
History of the Metropolitan Borough of Bury
Local government in the Metropolitan Borough of Bury
Urban districts of England
Ramsbottom